The first season of So You Think You Can Dance, a Dutch adaptation of the American show by the same name, premiered on RTL4 on September 4, 2008.  Unlike following seasons of the show, the first was broadcast in the Netherlands only and features only Dutch contestants. The finale aired December 11, 2008 and concluded with latin dancer Ivan Paulovich as champion. Paulovich won a choice of free dance study opportunities in the U.S., €20,000, and a role in the musical Footloose.

Judges

The first season featured permanent judges Jaakko Toivonen, Euvgenia Parakhina, and Dan Karaty.  Additional guest judges included Albert Verlinde, Penny de Jager, Kim-Lian van der Meij, Wendy van Dijk, and Eszteca Noya.

Auditions and bootcamp

Open auditions for the first season were held exclusively in Amsterdam.  Those dancers which impressed a panel of judges were sent forward to a "bootcamp," a several-day-long series of dance workshops (held in London, England for the first season).  After observing the dancers over the course of the workshops, the judges then selected a Top 18 group of finalists for the main competition phase of the show, referenced as "The live shows."

Live shows

From the top 18 to the top 10, the bottom three couples, based on each week's vote, were in danger of elimination from the competition and were required to "Dance for their lives" (perform a solo) to avoid being the one of the two dancers dismissed.  From the top 10 to the finale, dancers received votes as individuals, and not couples, and eliminations were determined solely by home viewer votes.

Elimination chart

Performances

Performance show 1 (October 23, 2008) 
Judge panel: Jaakko Toivonen, Euvgenia Parakhina, Dan Karaty, Albert Verlinde

Results show 1
 Group Choreography:"Don't Stop the Music"—Rihanna (Jazz, choreography by Mandy Moore)
 Dance for your life couples:
 Alessandro & Dapheny (Both dancers eliminated)
 Giorgio & Marielle
 Bram & Julia
 Solo's:
 Dapheney: Onbekend
 Alessandro: "Vivo Per Lei"—Andrea Bocelli ft. Laura Pausini
 Marielle: "Come on Girl"—Taio Cruz ft. Luciana
 Giorgio: "Renegades of Funk"—Rage Against the Machine
 Julia: "Blessing Dance"—Nomak
 Bram: "Sex, Love, &Money" - Mos Def
 New couples: None

Performance show 2 (October 30, 2008) 
Judge panel: Jaakko Toivonen, Euvgenia Parakhina, Dan Karaty

Results show 2
 Group Choreography: mix by "It's me, Bitches"—Swizz Beatz and "Don't Touch Me"—Busta Rhymes (Hip Hop, choreography by Eszteca Noya)
 Dance for your life couples:
 Boris & Eline (Eline eliminated)
 Giorgio & Marielle Constancia, (Giorgio eliminated)
 Uri & Anuschka
 Solo's:
 Eline: "7 Days to Change Your Life"—Jamie Cullum
 Boris: "Bamboo Banga"—M.I.A.
 Anusckha: "Secret Place"—Danity Kane
 Uri: "Rock Your Soul"—Elisa
 Marielle: "Ice Box"—Omarion
 Giorgio: "Que Se Sepa"—Roberto Roena
 New couples: Marielle and Boris

Performance show 3 (November 6, 2008) 
Judge panel: Jaakko Toivonen, Euvgenia Parakhina, Dan Karaty, Penny de Jager

Results show 3
 Group Choreography: "Wow"—Kylie Minogue (choreography by Roy Jonathans)
 Dance for your life couples:
 Ceraldo & Giotta (Both dancers eliminated)
 Ivan & Sigourney
 Bram & Julia
 Solo's:
 Giotta: "Green Light"—Beyoncé Knowles
 Ceraldo: "High Tide"—Pete Philly & Perquisite
 Julia: "Free Chilly"—Lupe Fiasco (ft. Shara Gree & Gem Stone)
 Bram: Onbekend
 Sigourney: "Sucka for Love"—Danity Kane
 Ivan: "Jump, Jive an' Wail "—The Brian Setzer Orchestra
 New couples: None

Performance show 4 (November 13, 2008) 
Judge panel: Jaakko Toivonen, Euvgenia Parakhina, Dan Karaty, Kim-Lian van der Meij

Results show 4
 Group Choreography: "Kijk Naar Mij"—Fame met Kim-Lian van der Meij (Broadway, choreography by Martin Michel)
 Dance for your life couples:
 Gianinni & Anne-May (Anne-May eliminated)
 Uri & Anuschka
 Boris & Marielle (Boris eliminated)
 Solo's:
 Anne-May: "Teardrop"—Massive Attack
 Giannini: "Hot Music"—Soho
 Anuschka: "Imaginary"—Evanescence
 Uri: "All You Gotta Change"—Alain Clark
 Marielle: "Viva La Vida"—Coldplay
 Boris: "Superman"—Robin Thicke
 New partners: From week five forward, new couples are assigned each week.

Performance show 5 (November 20, 2008) 
Judge panel: Jaakko Toivonen, Euvgenia Parakhina, Eszteca Noya, Albert Verlinde

 Solo's:
 Annemiek: "Breakaway"—Kelly Clarkson
 Ivan: Onbekend
 Marielle: "Put Your Hands Where My Eyes Can See"—Busta Rhymes
 Timor: Onbekend
 Julia: "The Workout"—Utada Hikaru
 Giannini: "Get Your Freak On"—Missy Elliott
 Sigourney: "You Will Be Under My Wheels"—The Prodigy
 Uri: "Dreaming With A Broken Heart"—John Mayer
 Anuschka: "Angel"—Do
 Bram: Onbekend
 Results show 5
 Group Choreography: "Llego la Hora"—Mercado Negro (Salsa, choreography by Brian van der Kust)
 Guest performance: Dirty Dancing Musical Cast (Mambo, Music: "Johnny's Mambo", choreography by Kate Champion)
 Result: Marielle and Uri vallen af

Performance show 6 (November 27, 2008) 
Judge panel: Jaakko Toivonen, Euvgenia Parakhina, Dan Karaty, Wendy van Dijk

 Solo's:
 Julia: "Promises (vocal mix)"—Bump&Flex
 Timor: "Boogaloo Anthem"—Funkmaster Ozone
 Anuschka: "Respect Remix"—Real el Canario
 Giannini: "I Feel Good"—James Brown
 Sigourney: "Amazing"—Kanye West
 Ivan: "Nike Freestyle"
 Annemiek: "Goodbye Is The Saddest Word"—Céline Dion
 Bram: Onbekend
 Results show 6
 Group Choreography: "Smooth Criminal"—Michael Jackson (Hip Hop, choreography by Vincent Vianen)
 Guest performance: Burn the Floor (Ballroom, Music: "4 Minutes"—Madonna ft. Justin Timberlake )
 Result: Sigourney and Bram vallen af

Performance show 7 (December 4, 2008) 
Judge panel: Jaakko Toivonen, Euvgenia Parakhina, Dan Karaty, Kim-Lian van der Meij

 Solo's:
 Julia: "His Mistakes"—Usher
 Ivan: "Kalinka"—Ivan Bodrov
 Annemiek: "The Rose"—Bette Midler
 Giannini: "Feels Good"—Tony! Toni! Toné!
 Anuschka: "Brave"—Idina Menzel
 Timor: "3 minutes"—DJ Fedde le Grand & DJ Funkerman
 Results show 7
 Group Choreography: "Galvanize"—The Chemical Brothers (Contemporary dance, choreography by Wies Bloemen and Yada van der Hoek)
 Result: Anuschka and Giannini vallen af

Performance show 8: Finale (December 11, 2008) 
Judge panel: Jaakko Toivonen, Euvgenia Parakhina, Dan Karaty, Albert Verlinde

 Group Choreography Top 18: "Closer"—Ne-Yo (Hip Hop, choreography by Dan Karaty)

 Solo's:
 Annemiek: "I'm a Believer"—Christina Milian
 Ivan: "From Russia With Love"—Matt Monro
 Julia: "In The Closet"—Michael Jackson
 Timor: "I Can Make You Shuooo...."—Fingazz
 Results show 8
 Group Choreography Top 4: "Footloose"—Footloose Cast NL (Broadway, choreography by Martin Michel)
 Guest performance: Jaakko Toivonen & Euvgenia Parakhina—Showdance (Music: "Hoodjump"—Soundtrack Mr. & Mrs. Smith
 Result:
 4th: Julia Mitomi
 3rd: Annemiek Suijkerbuijk
 Runner-Up: Timor Steffens
 Winner: Ivan Paulovich

See also 
 So You Think You Can Dance(Belgium and The Netherlands)
 So You Think You Can Dance, the original franchise

External links 
 Official website, vtm (Belgium)
 Official website, RTL (Netherlands)

Season 01
Dutch-language television shows